The synurids (order Synurales) are a small group of heterokont algae, found mostly in freshwater environments, characterized by cells covered in silica scales.

Characteristics

They are covered in silicate scales and spines.  In Synura, these are formed on the surface of the chloroplasts, two of which are usually present, but sometimes only one divided into two lobes is seen.  The cells have two heterokont flagella, inserted parallel to one another at the anterior, whose ultrastructure is a distinguishing characteristic of the group.  Both asexual and isogamous sexual reproduction occur.

Genera
Two major genera are included here, divided into species mainly based on the structure of the scales.

 Mallomonas species are free-living individual cells, usually 50-100 μm in length.  They have ornate scales and generally long spines.
 Synura species occur as spherical colonies, with the cells oriented so that the flagella point outwards, each usually around 30 μm in length.  The colonies are globular, rather than hollow, and spines are short if at all present.

Both are common plankton in lakes and ponds. In high concentrations, they dye the water yellow, and produce a distinctive odour.

To reproduce the parent cell splits into two daughter cells which get half of the parent cells scales. The new cells can regrow the scales and grow back into their original form.

History
The genus Synura was proposed in 1834 by the German microscopist Christian Gottfried Ehrenberg (1795–1876).

The synurids were originally included among the golden algae in the order Ochromonadales as the family Mallomonadaceae or as the family Synuraceae
.  They were formally defined as a separate group by Andersen in 1987, who placed them in their own class Synurophyceae, based on an earlier approach of more narrowly defining major lineages of chrysophyte algae by British phycologist David Hibberd.

The Chrysophyceae and Synurophyceae are currently recognized as closely related taxa within the Stramenopiles. Present classifications include the synurids as an order (Synurales) within Chrysophyceae.

References

External links

Ochrophyta
Heterokont orders